Mulher is a 1931 Brazilian film directed by Octávio Gabus Mendes, and starring Carmen Violeta and Celso Montenegro.

Cast 
Carmem Violeta	...	Carmem
Celso Montenegro	...	Flávio
Ruth Gentil	...	Lígia
Luís Soroa	...	Arthur
Gina Cavalieri	...	Lúcia
Carlos Eugênio	...	Oswaldo
Milton Marinho	...	Milton
Ernane Augusto	...	Butler
Augusta Guimarães	...	Carmem's Mother
Humberto Mauro	...	Carmem's Stepfather

References 

1931 films
1930s Portuguese-language films
Cinédia films
Brazilian romantic comedy-drama films
Brazilian black-and-white films
1930s romantic comedy-drama films
1931 comedy films
1931 drama films